Conus araneosus, common name the cobweb cone, is a species of sea snail, a marine gastropod mollusk in the family Conidae, the cone snails, cone shells or cones.

Like all species within the genus Conus, these snails are predatory and venomous. They are capable of "stinging" humans, therefore live ones should be handled carefully or not at all.

Subspecies
 Conus araneosus araneosus [Lightfoot], 1786
 Conus araneosus nicobaricus Hwass in Bruguière, 1792

Description
The size of an adult shell varies between 48 mm and 100mm. The shell is very closely reticulated with white and light chestnut, the white spots crowded and irregular in size, the chestnut lines forming two interrupted, irregular bands.

Distribution
This marine species occurs in the Indian Ocean off Tanzania, in the Indian Ocean off India and Sri Lanka and in the Pacific Ocean off the Philippines and Indonesia.

References
Citations

Bibliography
 Spry, J.F. (1961). The sea shells of Dar es Salaam: Gastropods. Tanganyika Notes and Records 56
 Filmer R.M. (2001). A Catalogue of Nomenclature and Taxonomy in the Living Conidae 1758 - 1998. Backhuys Publishers, Leiden. 388pp.
 Tucker J.K. (2009). Recent cone species database. September 4, 2009 Edition.
  Petit, R. E. (2009). George Brettingham Sowerby, I, II & III: their conchological publications and molluscan taxa. Zootaxa. 2189: 1–218
 Puillandre N., Duda T.F., Meyer C., Olivera B.M. & Bouchet P. (2015). One, four or 100 genera? A new classification of the cone snails. Journal of Molluscan Studies. 81: 1–23
 Franklin, J.B, S. Antony Fernando, B. A. Chalke, K. S. Krishnan. (2007). 'Radular Morphology of Conus (Gastropoda: Caenogastropoda: Conidae) from India'. Molluscan Research. Vol. 27 (3): 111–122.
 Franklin, J.B, K. A. Subramanian, S. A. Fernando and Krishnan K. S. (2009). Diversity and distribution of cone snails (Vallapoo) along the Tamil Nadu coast, India, Zootaxa 2250: 1–63.
 Franklin, J.B and Rajesh, R.P (2015).  "A sleep-inducing peptide from the venom of the Indian cone snail Conus araneosus" Toxicon 103 (2015) 39–47.

External links
 The Conus Biodiversity website
  
 Cone Shells – Knights of the Sea
 
	

araneosus
Gastropods described in 1786